Najwan is a given name. Notable people with the name include:

Najwan Darwish (born 1978), Arabic-language poet
Najwan Ghrayib (born 1974), Arab-Israeli footballer
Najwan Halimi (born 1985), Malaysian politician

See also

Najwa (disambiguation)

Masculine given names